Chenghai Lake is a plateau lake in Yunnan Province, China. Chenghai Lake is one of only three lakes in the world where Spirulina is found naturally.

Notes

Lakes of Yunnan
Geography of Lijiang